2C-B (4-Bromo-2,5-dimethoxyphenethylamine) is a psychedelic drug of the 2C family. It was first synthesized by Alexander Shulgin in 1974. In Shulgin's book PiHKAL, the dosage range is listed as 12–24 mg. As a recreational drug, 2C-B is sold as a white powder sometimes pressed in tablets or gel caps. It is also referred to by a number of street names. The drug is usually taken orally, but can also be insufflated or vaporized. While being primarily a psychedelic it is also a mild entactogen.

History 

2C-B was synthesized from 2,5-dimethoxybenzaldehyde by Alexander Shulgin in 1974. It first saw use among the psychiatric community as an aid during therapy.  2C-B was first sold commercially as a purported aphrodisiac under the trade name "Erox", which was manufactured by the German pharmaceutical company Drittewelle. For several years, it was available as tablets in Dutch smart shops under the name "Nexus" and "B-Dub".

Patterns of use
2C-B first became popularized in the United States as a short-lived substitute for the street drug Ecstasy when MDMA became illegal in 1985. Many 2C-B users are young adults who attend raves.  Though 2C-B is still used in the rave subculture, commonly mistaken for and/or sold as Ecstasy, its intentional use has become more common in the 2000s.

Street prices range between $10 and $30 per tablet in the United States in 2011 when purchased in small quantities. The current street price in the Netherlands ranges between €3 and €5 per tablet. Larger retail purchases cost between $200 and $500 per gram. Wholesale purchases of 2C-B can lower the price ($100 to $300 per gram in 2001, $30 to $100 on the darknet in 2020).

A powder which has been dyed pink may be sold as "tucibi", "tuci", "tussi" or "pink cocaine". This is not synonymous with 2C-B and instead refers to a mixture of drugs with pink dye. It is a more recent innovation from Colombia with large consumption groups in Europe and the United States. It is very rare for tusi to contain any actual 2C-B, with the most common ingredients being ketamine, MDMA, and caffeine. Fentanyl and other opioids are also commonly seen in it as well.

Toxicity and dosage

The September 1998 issue of Journal of Analytical Toxicology reported that very little data exists about the pharmacological properties, metabolism, and toxicity of 2C-B. The relationship between its use and death are unknown. The common oral recreational dose is around 15–25 mg, at which visual and auditory effects are experienced. Severe adverse reactions are extremely rare, but use of 2C-B was linked to significant brain injury in one case report; the alleged "2C-B" was never actually discovered by testing so the only evidence suggesting 2C-B was the cause was the victim's own words, and drug adulteration and toxic impurities are very common in illegal drugs.

The lethal dosage is unknown. It was reported in PiHKAL, by Alexander Shulgin, that a psychologist had accidentally taken a 100 mg dose orally without apparent harm.

When sold as "Ecstasy", tablets containing 2C-B often contain about 5 mg of the drug, an amount which produces stimulatory effects that mimic the effects of MDMA; in contrast, tablets marketed as 2C-B have larger quantities of the drug (10–20 mg) which cause hallucinogenic effects. Street purity of 2C-B, when tested, has been found to be relatively high. Researchers in Spain found that 2C-B samples in the country doubled between 2006 and 2009, switched from primarily powder form to tablets, and exhibited "low falsification rates". An analysis of street samples in the Netherlands found impurities "in small percentages"; only one of the impurities, the N-acetyl derivative of 2C-B, could be identified, and comprised 1.3% of the sample. The authors suggested that this compound was a by-product of 2C-B synthesis.

Effects

Little academic research has been conducted on the effects of 2C-B in humans. The information available is largely anecdotal and limited. Effects are often described as being more easily managed than other psychedelics; it is often compared to a mixture of a serotonergic psychedelic and MDMA.  At 5–10 mg, experiments with young chickens have shown it to produce effects similar to a low dosage of amphetamines.

The anecdotal effects of 2C-B that have been reported by users on online discussion forums include:
 At low doses, the experience may shift in intensity from engaging to mild/undetectable. Experienced users report the ability to take control of the effects and switch from engaged to sober at will.
 The hallucinations have a tendency to decrease and then increase in intensity, giving the users a sense of "waves" or even glowing. These are popularly described as "clichéd '70s visuals" or objects taking on "water color"-like textures.
 While the effects of the drug often render users unable to concentrate deeply on anything in particular, some can become engrossed in an activity such as watching a movie or playing a video game, distracting themselves from the visual and auditory effects of the drug.
 Excessive giggling or smiling is common, as is a tendency for deeper "belly laughs".
 Some users say that the effects are more intense when listening to music and report that they can see sounds and noises.
 Some users experience a decrease in visual acuity, although others report sharper vision.
 Through increased awareness of one's body, attention may be brought to perceived "imperfections" or internal body processes.The following effects are highly dose-dependent.
 Open eye visuals (OEVs), such as cartoon-like distortions and red or green halos around objects. Closed eye visuals (CEVs) are more common than OEVs.
 Affects and alters ability to communicate, engage in deep thought, or maintain attention span.
 Some users report experiencing frightening or fearful effects during the experience. Users describe feeling frigid or cold on reaching a plateau, while others feel wrapped in comfortable blankets/ultimate pleasure.
 Coordination may be affected; some users lose balance or have perceptual distinction problems.
 Onset time of 2C-B is highly dose dependent, but usually from 45 to 75 minutes. Taken on a full stomach, the onset time is increased to two hours or more.
 Before it was scheduled, 2C-B was sold in small doses as an aphrodisiac (see History). Some users report aphrodisiac effects at lower doses.

Side effects
 Some users report mild "jitters" (body tremors), shuddering breath, and/or mild muscle spasms after insufflating 2C-B. Whether or not these effects are enjoyable depends on the user;
 Mild to intense diarrhea, gas, nausea, and general gastrointestinal discomfort;
 Severe headaches after coming down from large doses have been reported. However, many users report a lack of "comedown" or "crash", instead noting a gradual return to sobriety;
 At doses over 30–40 mg the user may experience frightening hallucinations, as well as tachycardia, hypertension, and hyperthermia;
 2C-B HCl is very painful to insufflate. Anecdotal evidence suggests that 2C-B HBr, the hydrobromide salt with greater water solubility, is less irritating to the mucous membranes lining the nose but slightly less potent when compared dose-for-dose with the HCl salt;
Rectal administration of a water-based solution of 2C-B is known to be less painful than insufflation and much more potent than oral administration.

Duration
When orally consumed, 2C-B has a much longer delay before the onset of effects than when it is insufflated. Oral ingestion generally takes roughly 45–75 minutes for the effects to be felt, plateau lasts 2–4 hours, and coming down lasts 1–2 hours. Rectal administration onset varies from 5–20 minutes. Insufflated onset takes 1–10 minutes for effects to be felt. The duration can last from 4 to 12 hours depending on route of administration, dose, and other factors.

With insufflation, the effects are more abrupt and intense but have a significantly shorter duration, while oral usage results in a milder, longer experience. When insufflated, the onset happens very rapidly, usually reaching the peak at about 20–40 minutes and plateauing for 2–3 hours. 2C-B is also considered one of the most painful drugs to insufflate, with users reporting intense nasal burning.  The sudden intensity of the experience combined with the pain can often start the experience with a negative imprint and nausea is also increased with insufflation, compounding the issue.

Pharmacology

Unlike most psychedelics, 2C-B has been shown to be a low efficacy human serotonin 5-HT2A and 5-HT2C receptor partial agonist. This suggests that activation of the 5-HT2A-coupled phospholipase D pathway or functional antagonism of 5-HT2A may also play a role. The rank order of 5-HT2A receptor antagonist potency for this family of drugs in Xenopus is 2C-I > 2C-B > 2C-D > 2C-H.

Research suggests that 2C-B increases dopamine levels in the brains of rats, which may contribute to its psychoactivity.

Metabolism
2C-B has been shown to be metabolized by liver hepatocytes, resulting in deamination and demethylation that produces several products. Oxidative deamination results in the 2-(4-bromo-2,5-dimethoxyphenyl)-ethanol (BDMPE) and 4-bromo-2,5-dimethoxyphenylacetic acid (BDMPAA) metabolites. Additionally, 4-bromo-2,5-dimethoxybenzoic acid (BDMBA) can also be produced by oxidative deamination. Further metabolism of BDMPE and BDMPAA may occur by demethylation. Alternatively, the later metabolites can be generated by demethylation of 2C-B followed by oxidative deamination.

There is species differentiation in the metabolism of 2C-B. Mice hepatocytes produce 4-bromo-2,5-dimethoxy-phenol (BDMP), a previously unknown metabolite. Meanwhile, human, monkey and rabbit hepatocytes produce 2-(4-bromo-2-hydroxy-5-methoxyphenyl)-ethanol (B-2-HMPE), but dog, rat and mouse hepatocytes do not. 2C-B also reduces aggressive responses in drugged rats.

Analogues and derivatives

A variety of N-substituted derivatives of 2C-B have been tested, including N-methyl-2CB, N,N-dimethyl-2CB, N-ethyl-2CB and N-benzyl-2CB. Most simple alkyl derivatives were considerably less potent than 2C-B, with N-ethyl-2CB for instance having a 40 times lower affinity for the 5-HT2A receptor. The N-benzyl derivative however was found to have higher binding affinity than 2C-B itself, with N-(4-bromobenzyl)-2CB binding even more tightly. This initial research did not include functional assays of activity, but later led to the development of potent substituted N-benzyl derivatives such as 25B-NBOMe, and 25B-NBOH.

Entheogenic use 

2C-B was used as entheogen by the Sangoma, Nyanga, and Amagqirha people in place of their traditional plants; they refer to the chemical as Ubulawu Nomathotholo, which roughly translates to "Medicine of the Singing Ancestors".

Reagent results 
Exposing compounds to the reagents gives a colour change which is indicative of the compound under test.

Drug prohibition laws

United Nations
The UN Commission on Narcotic Drugs added 2C-B to Schedule II of the Convention on Psychotropic Substances in March 2001.

2C-B was mislabelled "2 C-B" in the Green List 26th edition, 2015. However, this was corrected in Green List 27th edition, 2016.

2C-B is a scheduled drug in most jurisdictions. The following is a partial list of territories where the substance has been scheduled.

Countries

Argentina
2C-B is controlled under the List 1, as well as similar substances like 2C-I or 2C-T-2.

Australia
2C-B is controlled in Australia and on the list of substances subject to import and export controls (Appendix B). It was placed on Schedule One of the Drugs Misuse and Trafficking Act when it first came to notice in 1994, when in a showcase legal battle chemist R. Simpson was charged with manufacturing the substance in Sydney. Alexander Shulgin came to Australia to testify on behalf of the defense, to no avail.

2C-B is not specifically listed in the Australia Poisons Standard (October 2015), however similar drugs such as 2C-T-2 and 2C-I are making 2C-B fall under the Australian analogue act.

Belgium
In Belgium, 2C-B is a controlled substance making production, distribution, and possession illegal.

Brazil
In Brazil, 2C-B is a controlled substance making production, distribution, and possession illegal.

Canada
In Canada, 2C-B is classified under Controlled Drugs and Substances Act as Schedule III as "4-bromo-2,5-dimethoxybenzeneethanamine and any salt, isomer or salt of isomer thereof".

2C-B has been rescheduled (Schedule III), in a new amendment, taking effect on October 31, 2016.  This is to include the other 2C-x analogues.

Chile

Czech Republic
Possession of more than 200 mg of 2C-B is punishable with a two years jail sentence. Smaller amount is punishable by a fine. The 200 mg threshold is merely a guideline which the court can reconsider depending on circumstances.

Denmark
In Denmark, 2C-B is listed as a category B drug.

Estonia
In Estonia, 2C-B is classified as Schedule I.

Germany
In Germany, 2C-B is controlled in the Betäubungsmittelgesetz (BtMG) Anlage I as "Bromdimethoxyphenethylamin" (BDMPEA).

Italy
2C-B is schedule I (tabella I).

Japan
In Japan, 2C-B was scheduled in 1998. It was previously marketed as "Performax".

Luxembourg 
In Luxembourg, 2C-B is a prohibited substance since 2001.

Netherlands
In the Netherlands, 2C-B was scheduled on July 9, 1997.

In the Netherlands, 2C-B became a list I substance of the Opium Law despite no health incidents occurring. Following the ban, other phenethylamines were sold in place of 2C-B until the Netherlands became the first country in the world to ban 2C-I, 2C-T-2 and 2C-T-7 alongside 2C-B.

Norway
In Norway, 2C-B was classified as Schedule II on March 22, 2004, listed as 4-bromo-2,5-dimethoxyphenethylamine.

Poland
2C-B is schedule I (I-P group) in Poland.

Russia
Banned as a narcotic drug with a criminal penalty for possession of at least 10 mg.

Spain
In Spain, 2C-B was added to Category 2 prohibited substances in 2002.

Sweden
2C-B is currently classified as Schedule I in Sweden.

2C-B was first classified as "health hazard" under the act  (Act on the Prohibition of Certain Goods Dangerous to Health) as of April 1, 1999, under SFS 1999:58 that made it illegal to sell or possess. Then it became schedule I as of June 1, 2002, published in LVFS 2002:4 but mislabeled "2-CB" in the document. However, this was corrected in a new document, LVFS 2009:22 effective December 9, 2009.

Switzerland
In Switzerland, 2C-B is listed in Anhang D of the DetMV and is illegal to possess.

UK
All drugs in the 2C family are Class A under the Misuse of Drugs Act which means they are illegal to produce, supply or possess. Possession carries a maximum sentence of seven years imprisonment while supply is punishable by life imprisonment and an unlimited fine.

United States
In the United States, 2C-B is classified as CSA Schedule I Section (d) Subsection (3) 4-Bromo-2,5-dimethoxyphenethylamine.

In the United States, a notice of proposed rulemaking published on December 20, 1994, in the Federal Register and after a review of relevant data, the Deputy Administrator of the Drug Enforcement Administration (DEA) proposed to place 4-bromo-2,5-DMPEA into Schedule I, making 2C-B illegal in the United States. This became permanent law on July 2, 1995.

References

External links 
 2C-B Entry in PiHKAL
 2C-B Entry in PiHKAL • info
 Erowid 2C-B vault—includes reports from users of 2C-B, as well as scientific and government reports
 2C-B Dosage chart

2C (psychedelics)
Entactogens and empathogens
Entheogens
Bromoarenes
O-methylated phenols